The Green Mill Cocktail Lounge (or Green Mill Jazz Club) is an entertainment venue on Broadway in Uptown, Chicago. It is known for its jazz and poetry performances, along with its connections to Chicago mob history.

The business is considered one of the most famous bars in the United States and the most iconic in Illinois.

History
Originally named Pop Morse's Roadhouse, the business opened in 1907. The bar was purchased by Tom Chamales, a real estate developer and tavern owner, and was renamed Green Mill Gardens in 1910, a nod to the famous Moulin Rouge ("Red Mill") of Paris. In its early years, it was a popular hangout for movie actors from nearby Essanay Studios. The namesake gardens were removed in the 1920s during the construction of the Uptown Theatre on the same block. 

During the Prohibition era, "Machine Gun" Jack McGurn of Al Capone's Chicago Outfit became a part-owner. Singer and comedian Joe E. Lewis was attacked by McGurn's men in 1927 after he refused to take his act to the Green Mill. Lewis' throat was slashed, but he survived. The incident inspired the 1957 film The Joker Is Wild.

Al Capone's favorite booth is still in the establishment located directly west of the short end of the bar. Capone and his men would sit here because it afforded clear views of both the front and back entrances to the establishment. There is still an access hatch to the tunnels located directly behind the long end of the bar that leads underneath the street to an adjacent building; this is how Capone was able to elude the authorities when he visited the Green Mill.

After the end of Prohibition, the Green Mill became a more reputable establishment, attracting many popular jazz acts including Louis Armstrong, Billie Holiday and Al Jolson, along with cabaret icons like Texas Guinan: a onetime rodeo rider and vaudeville performer, Guinan reinvented herself during Prohibition as a bawdy, breezy master of ceremonies for cabaret shows at spots like the 300 Club in New York before coming to Chicago for a brief period from 1928 to 1930.

The business began to struggle following World War II. The Batsis brothers bought Green Mill in 1940, who then sold it in 1960 to Steve Brend who had worked for Jack McGurn as a kid and was called the "Mayor of Uptown" for his gregarious nature and proclivity for storytelling. During that period, the Green Mill went from a nightlife hub to a place where day drinking and drug use were the norm, but was purchased and revitalized by Dave Jemilo, a south-sider and owner of the bar Deja Vu in 1986. 

The Green Mill also became home to the Uptown Poetry Slam on Sunday nights, and is the longest running poetry slam in the country.

Chicago-based comic Whitney Chitwood recorded her 2019 album The Bakery Case live at the Green Mill; the album reached No. 9 on the Billboard comedy chart and was the first comedy album to be recorded at the club.

Recently the Green Mill hosts performers ranging from jazz quartets to swing orchestras who frequently play to a packed house. During quieter performances, staff may ask patrons to put their phones away and refrain from loud talking. Behind the bar stands a small table with a shrine to Al Capone as a tribute to the earlier days.

In popular culture
Over the years, the Green Mill has appeared in many films, such as Thief (1981), Next of Kin (1989), V. I. Warshawski (1991), Prelude to a Kiss (1992), Folks! (1992), A Family Thing (1996), Soul Food (1997), High Fidelity (2000), The Lake House (2006), The Dilemma (2011) and Chicago Overcoat (2010).

In the Star Trek Voyager episode "Course: Oblivion" the Green Mill is mentioned by the character Tom Paris as a "Genuine speakeasy".

References

External links

Music venues in Chicago
Nightclubs in Chicago
1907 establishments in Illinois
Jazz clubs in Chicago